The Oceania Zonal Volleyball Association (OZVA), also known as Oceania Volleyball, is the governing body for the sports of indoor, beach and grass volleyball in Oceania.

In the spirit of the FIVB 2001 Plan, AVC was the first to create five Zonal Associations at the 10th General Assembly in December 1993 prior to the FIVB Centennial Congress in September 1994.

Members associations

Ranking

Men's national teams

Senior team
Rankings are calculated by FIVB.

Last updated 22 August 2016

Women's national teams

Senior team
Rankings are calculated by FIVB.

Last updated 22 August 2016

Executive Board Members

(As of October 21, 2020)

Competitions

Volleyball

Beach volleyball

See also 

 Central Asian Volleyball Association
 East Asian Zonal Volleyball Association
 Southeast Asian Volleyball Association

References

External links
 
Oceania Volleyball official website 

Sports organizations established in 1993
1993 establishments in Asia
Volleyball in Asia
1993 establishments in Oceania
Volleyball in Oceania